This article lists Australian politicians. It includes members of the Parliament of Australia and members of state and territory parliaments.

Members of the Australian Parliament 
For current members, see 
 List of members of the Australian House of Representatives
 List of members of the Australian Senate

Members of state and territory parliaments
For current members, see 
 Members of the Australian Capital Territory Legislative Assembly, 2012–2016
 Members of the New South Wales Legislative Assembly, 2015–2019
 Members of the New South Wales Legislative Council, 2015–2019
 Members of the Northern Territory Legislative Assembly, 2012–2016
 Members of the Queensland Legislative Assembly, 2015–2018
 Members of the South Australian House of Assembly, 2014–2018
 Members of the South Australian Legislative Council, 2014–2018
 Members of the Tasmanian House of Assembly, 2014–2018
 Members of the Tasmanian Legislative Council, 2011–2017
 Members of the Victorian Legislative Assembly, 2014–2018
 Members of the Victorian Legislative Council, 2014–2018
 Members of the Western Australian Legislative Assembly, 2013–2017
 Members of the Western Australian Legislative Council, 2013–2017

See also
 Politics of Australia
 Premiers of the Australian states
 List of Asian Australian politicians
 List of Australian actor-politicians
 List of Australian politicians of Indian origin
 List of Australian sportsperson-politicians
 List of Indigenous Australian politicians